Dieter Weller is a computer engineer from HGST, a company owned by Western Digital of San Jose, California. He was named a Fellow of the Institute of Electrical and Electronics Engineers (IEEE) in 2015 for his contributions to heat-assisted magnetic recording media.

References 

Fellow Members of the IEEE
Living people
Year of birth missing (living people)
Place of birth missing (living people)
Fellows of the American Physical Society